Jyri Junnila (born April 7, 1984) is a Finnish professional ice hockey Right Wing who is currently playing for KalPa in the Finnish Liiga. He previously played for Kärpät in the Finnish Liiga.

On 30 January 2019, Junnila joined KalPa for the completion of the 2018–19 season.

References

External links

1984 births
Finnish ice hockey right wingers
Hokki players
KalPa players
Kiekko-Laser players
Living people
Oulun Kärpät players
SaiPa players
Tappara players
People from Raahe
Sportspeople from North Ostrobothnia